"Aerial Love" is the debut solo single by Australian recording artist, Daniel Johns. It was released on 29 January 2015 as the lead single from his debut solo studio album, Talk. It peaked at number 21 on the Australian ARIA Charts.

Background
Johns said the sing "is about loneliness, sex and uninhibited love." In speaking with Today John said "It's taken so long to release new music because when we decided to take a break from Silverchair, I took time to step away from the spotlight and just craft a little bit. The video is me on my own personal journey through a desert which is metaphor for loneliness and discovering a world of sexual being and a world of uninhibited love."

Music video
The music video was directed by Lorin Askill and was filmed on the Stockton Dunes just outside of Newcastle, New South Wales and has been designed to mirror "the song's weightless, timeless, slyly carnal feel".

Reception
auspOp described the song as "gorgeous, slick, stripped-back, smooth and soft and melds beautifully with Daniel's delicate vocal."

Monica Tan from The Guardian described the song as "a soft and slow, soulful ballad... that sees Johns alternate between a sultry croon and a nicely controlled falsetto over a throbbing drum beat."

Accolades 
At the ARIA Music Awards of 2015, the song was nominated for ARIA Award for Best Video.

The song was shortlisted for Song of the Year at the APRA Music Awards of 2016.

Track listings

Charts

References

2015 songs
2015 singles
Songs written by Daniel Johns
Songs written by Joel Little